The South Platte Sentinel is a newspaper serving Logan County, Colorado since 1988.

References

Newspapers published in Colorado
Logan County, Colorado